Victoria București competed in UEFA football competitions. Their best performance was reaching the quarterfinals of the 1988–89 UEFA Cup where they lost to Dynamo Dresden.

All time statistics

By competition

By season

By country

References

Romanian football clubs in international competitions
Victoria București